The Caledonian Railway 300 Class were freight 0-6-0 tender engines introduced in 1918 and designed by William Pickersgill. Forty-three were built between 1918 and 1920. They were numbered 294–324, 280, 281, 670–679 by the Caledonian Railway.

Ownership changes
In 1923, they all passed to the London, Midland and Scottish Railway, and were classified 3F, and renumbered 17650–17692. On nationalisation in 1948, the twenty-three survivors passed into British Railways stock, and were renumbered by adding 40000 to their LMS numbers.

Numbering table

Note 1
Not all the BR numbers were actually applied because some engines had been withdrawn before 1948. They were withdrawn between 1934 and 1963, and all were scrapped.

See also 
 Locomotives of the Caledonian Railway

References

External links 
 Rail UK database 300 Class (described here as 294 Class)

294
0-6-0 locomotives
Railway locomotives introduced in 1918
Standard gauge steam locomotives of Great Britain
Scrapped locomotives

Freight locomotives